HSBC Holdings plc is a British multinational universal bank and financial services holding company. It is the largest bank in Europe by total assets ahead of BNP Paribas, with US$2.953 trillion as of December 2021. In 2021, HSBC had $10.8 trillion in assets under custody (AUC) and $4.9 trillion in assets under administration (AUA). HSBC traces its origin to a hong in British Hong Kong, and its present form was established in London by the Hongkong and Shanghai Banking Corporation to act as a new group holding company in 1991; its name derives from that company's initials. The Hongkong and Shanghai Banking Corporation opened branches in Shanghai in 1865 and was first formally incorporated in 1866.

HSBC has offices in 64 countries and territories across Africa, Asia, Oceania, Europe, North America, and South America, serving around 40 million customers. As of 2022, it was ranked no. 38 in the world in the Forbes rankings of large companies ranked by sales, profits, assets, and market value.

HSBC is organised within three business groups: Commercial Banking, Global Banking and Markets, and Wealth and Personal Banking. In 2020, the bank announced that it would consolidate its Retail Banking & Wealth Management arm with Global Private Banking, to form Wealth & Personal Banking.

HSBC has a dual primary listing on the Hong Kong Stock Exchange and London Stock Exchange and is a constituent of the Hang Seng Index and the FTSE 100 Index. It has secondary listings on the New York Stock Exchange, and the Bermuda Stock Exchange.

HSBC has had a number of controversies and the bank has been repeatedly fined for money laundering (sometimes in relation with criminal organizations such as the Sinaloa cartel) or setting up large scale tax avoidance schemes.

History

Origins to 2000

The Hongkong and Shanghai Bank was founded by the Scottish banker, Thomas Sutherland, in the then-British colony of British Hong Kong on 3 March 1865, and in Shanghai a month later, benefiting from the start of trading into China, including opium trading. It was formally incorporated as The Hongkong and Shanghai Banking Corporation by an Ordinance of the Legislative Council of Hong Kong on 14 August 1866. In 1980, HSBC acquired a 51% shareholding in US-based Marine Midland Bank, which it extended to full ownership in 1987. On 6 October 1989, it was renamed by the legislative council, by an amendment to its governing ordinance originally made in 1929, to The Hongkong and Shanghai Banking Corporation Limited, and became registered as a regulated bank with the then Banking Commissioner of the Government of Hong Kong.

During the Konfrontasi period in the 1960s, a group of Indonesian forces bombed the MacDonald House building in Singapore (at the time used by HSBC) just a few months after Singapore was granted its independence from Malaysia. A number of people were killed and the two military officers responsible for the bombing were tried and executed.

HSBC Holdings plc, originally incorporated in England and Wales, was a non-trading, dormant shelf company when it completed its transformation on 25 March 1991 into the parent holding company to the Hongkong and Shanghai Banking Corporation Limited now as a subsidiary, in preparation for its purchase of the UK-based Midland Bank and the impending transfer of sovereignty of Hong Kong to China. HSBC Holdings' acquisition of Midland Bank was completed in 1992 and gave HSBC a substantial market presence in the United Kingdom. As part of the takeover conditions for the acquisition, HSBC Holdings plc was required to relocate its world headquarters from Hong Kong to London in 1993.

Major acquisitions in South America started with the purchase of the Banco Bamerindus of Brazil for $1 billion in March 1997 and the acquisition of Roberts SA de Inversiones of Argentina for $600 million in May 1997. In May 1999, HSBC expanded its presence in the United States with the purchase of Republic National Bank of New York for $10.3 billion.

2000 to 2010

Expansion into Continental Europe took place in April 2000 with the acquisition of Crédit Commercial de France, a large French bank, for £6.6 billion. In July 2001 HSBC bought Demirbank, an insolvent Turkish bank. In July 2002, Arthur Andersen announced that HSBC USA, Inc., through a new subsidiary, Wealth and Tax Advisory Services USA Inc. (WTAS), would purchase a portion of Andersen's tax practice. The new HSBC Private Client Services Group would serve the wealth and tax advisory needs of high-net-worth individuals. Then in August 2002 HSBC acquired Grupo Financiero Bital, SA de CV, Mexico's third largest retail bank for $1.1 billion.

In November 2002, HSBC expanded further in the United States. Under the chairmanship of John Bond, it spent £9 billion (US$15.5 billion) to acquire Household Finance Corporation (HFC), a US credit card issuer and subprime lender. In a 2003 cover story, The Banker noted "when banking historians look back, they may conclude that [it] was the deal of the first decade of the 21st century". Under the new name of HSBC Finance, the division was the second largest subprime lender in the United States.

The new headquarters of HSBC Holdings at 8 Canada Square, London officially opened in April 2003.

In July 2003, HSBC announced that it had a agreed to acquire 82.19% of the Korean fund administrator, Asset Management Technology (AM TeK), for $12.47 million in cash; it was the largest fund administrator in South Korea, with $24 billion of assets under administration. In September 2003 HSBC bought Polski Kredyt Bank SA of Poland for $7.8 million. In June 2004 HSBC expanded into China buying 19.9% of the Bank of Communications of Shanghai. In the United Kingdom HSBC acquired Marks & Spencer Retail Financial Services Holdings Ltd for £763 million in December 2004. Acquisitions in 2005 included Metris Inc, a US credit card issuer for $1.6 billion in August and 70.1% of Dar es Salaam Investment Bank of Iraq in October. In April 2006, HSBC bought the 90 branches in Argentina of Banca Nazionale del Lavoro for $155 million. In December 2007 HSBC acquired the Chinese Bank in Taiwan. In May 2008, HSBC acquired IL&FS Investment, an Indian retail broking firm.

In 2005, Bloomberg Markets magazine accused HSBC of money laundering for drug dealers and state sponsors of terrorism. Then-CEO Stephen Green said that "This was a singular and wholly irresponsible attack on the bank's international compliance procedures", but subsequent investigation indicated that it was accurate and proved that the bank was involved in money laundering for the Sinaloa Cartel and throughout Mexico.

In July 2006, HSBC announced that it would acquire Westpac's sub-custody operations in Australia and New Zealand for $112.5 million, making HSBC the leading sub-custody and clearing player in Australia and New Zealand.

In 2007, HSBC wrote down its holdings of subprime-related mortgage securities by $10.5 billion, becoming the first major bank to report its losses due to the unfolding subprime mortgage crisis.

According to Bloomberg, "HSBC is one of world's strongest banks by some measures". When HM Treasury required all UK banks to increase their capital in October 2007, the group transferred £750 million to London within hours, and announced that it had just lent £4 billion to other UK banks.

In March 2009, HSBC announced that it would shut down the branch network of its HSBC Finance arm in the United States, leading to nearly 6,000 job losses and leaving only the credit card business to continue operating. Chairman Stephen Green stated, "HSBC has a reputation for telling it as it is. With the benefit of hindsight, this is an acquisition we wish we had not undertaken." According to analyst Colin Morton, "the takeover was an absolute disaster".

In March 2009, it announced that it had made US$9.3 billion of profit in 2008 and announced a £12.5 billion (US$17.7 billion; HK$138 billion) rights issue to enable it to buy other banks that were struggling to survive. However, uncertainty over the rights issue's implications for institutional investors caused volatility in the Hong Kong stock market: on 9 March 2009 HSBC's share price fell 24.14%, with 12 million shares sold in the last few seconds of trading.

2010 to 2013
On 25 April 2011, HSBC decided to shut down its retail banking business in Russia and reduce its private banking presence to a representative office.

On 11 May 2013, the new chief executive Stuart Gulliver announced that HSBC would refocus its business strategy and that a large-scale retrenchment of operations, particularly in respect of the retail sector, was planned. HSBC would no longer seek to be 'the world's local bank', as costs associated with this were spiraling and US$3.5 billion needed to be saved by 2013, with the aim of bringing overheads down from 55% of revenues to 48%. In 2010, then-chairman Stephen Green planned to depart HSBC to accept a government appointment in the Trade Ministry. Group Chief Executive Michael Geoghegan was expected to become the next chairman. However, while many current and former senior employees supported the tradition of promoting the chief executive to chairman, many shareholders instead pushed for an external candidate. HSBC's board of directors had reportedly been split over the succession planning and investors were alarmed that the row would damage the company.

On 23 September 2010, Geoghegan announced he would step down as chief executive of HSBC. He was succeeded as chief executive by Stuart Gulliver, while Green was succeeded as chairman by Douglas Flint; Flint was serving as HSBC's finance director (chief financial officer). August 2011: Further to CEO Stuart Gulliver's plan to cut $3.5 billion in costs over the next two years, HSBC announced that it will cut 25,000 jobs and exit from 20 countries by 2013 in addition to 5,000 job cuts announced earlier in the year. The consumer banking division of HSBC will focus on the UK, Hong Kong, high-growth markets such as Mexico, Singapore, Turkey, and Brazil, and smaller countries where it has a leading market share. According to Reuters, Chief Executive Stuart Gulliver told the media, "There will be further job cuts. There will be something like 25,000 roles eliminated between now and the end of 2013."

In August 2011 "to align our U.S. business with our global network and meet the local and international needs of domestic and overseas clients", HSBC agreed to sell 195 branches in New York and Connecticut to First Niagara Financial Group Inc, and divestures to KeyCorp, Community Bank, N.A. and Five Star Bank for around $1 billion, and announced the closure of 13 branches in Connecticut and New Jersey. The rest of HSBC's U.S. network will only be about half from a total 470 branches before divestments. On 9 August 2011, Capital One Financial Corp. agreed to acquire HSBC's U.S. credit card business for $2.6 billion, netting HSBC Holdings an estimated after-tax profit of $2.4 billion. In September it was announced that HSBC sought to sell its general insurance business for around $1 billion.

In 2012, HSBC was the subject of hearings of the U.S. Senate permanent subcommittee for investigations for severe deficiencies in its anti-money laundering practices (see Controversies). On 16 July the committee presented its findings. Among other things, it concluded that HSBC had been transferring $7 billion in banknotes from its Mexican to its US subsidiary (much of it related to drug dealing), was disregarding terrorist financing links and was actively circumventing US safeguards to block transactions involving terrorists, drug lords and rogue regimes, including hiding $19.4 billion in transactions with Iran. This investigation followed on from a probe by the US Federal Reserve and Office of the Comptroller of the Currency found that there was "significant potential for unreported money laundering or terrorist financing".

On 11 December 2012, HSBC agreed to pay a record $1.92 billion fine in this money laundering case. "Bank officials repeatedly ignored internal warnings that HSBC's monitoring systems were inadequate, the Justice Department said. In 2008, for example, the CEO of HSBC Mexico was told that Mexican law enforcement had a recording of a Mexican drug lord saying that HSBC Mexico was the place to launder money." The United States Department of Justice, however, decided not to pursue criminal penalties, a decision which the New York Times labelled a "dark day for the rule of law." HSBC chief executive Stuart Gulliver said: "We accept responsibility for our past mistakes. We have said we are profoundly sorry for them, and we do so again."

Since 2013
In July 2013, Alan Keir was appointed chief executive of HSBC Bank plc after Brian Robertson resigned from his post. Keir's duties include overseeing the firm's UK, European, Middle Eastern, and African divisions.

In June 2014, an indirect wholly-owned subsidiary HSBC Life (UK) Limited agreed to sell its £4.2 billion UK pensions business to Swiss Re. In February 2015 the International Consortium of Investigative Journalists released information about the business conduct of HSBC under the title Swiss Leaks based on the 2007 hacked HSBC account records from whistle-blower Hervé Falciani. The ICIJ alleges that the bank profited from doing business with corrupt politicians, dictators, tax evaders, dealers of blood diamonds, arms dealers and other clients. US Senate investigators in 2012 had sought the hacked HSBC account records from Falciani and French authorities, but never received the data.

HSBC announced in August 2015 that it would be selling its Brazilian unit to Banco Bradesco for $5.2 billion following years of disappointing performance. In 2015, HSBC was recognised as the most trusted foreign bank in India by The Brand Trust Report 2015.

In 2016, the bank was mentioned numerous times in connection with the Panama Papers investigation. Many Syrians were angered when their accounts were judged high-risk and closed, despite the bank reportedly telling Mossack Fonseca it was "comfortable" with Rami Makhlouf as a customer, even though US Treasury sanctions against him were in effect at the time.

On 20 March 2017, the British newspaper The Guardian reported that hundreds of banks had helped launder KGB-related funds out of Russia, as uncovered by an investigation named Global Laundromat. HSBC was listed among the 17 banks in the UK that were "facing questions over what they knew about the international scheme and why they did not turn away suspicious money transfers," as HSBC "processed $545.3m in Laundromat cash, mostly routed through its Hong Kong branch." Other banks facing scrutiny under the investigation included the Royal Bank of Scotland, NatWest, Lloyds, Barclays and Coutts. In response, HSBC stated that it was against financial crime, and that the case "highlights the need for greater information sharing between the public and private sectors."

On 1 October 2017, Mark Tucker succeeded Douglas Flint as group chairman of HSBC, the first non-executive and outside chairman appointed by the group. Also in October 2017, HSBC announced that John Flint, chief executive of Retail Banking and Wealth Management, would succeed Stuart Gulliver as Group Chief Executive on 21 February 2018. It was further announced on 5 August 2019 that Flint was leaving and his role would be filled on a temporary basis by Noel Quinn, head of HSBC's global commercial bank. Noel Quinn was subsequently appointed to the role on a permanent basis in March 2020.

In February 2020, HSBC announced it would cut 35,000 jobs worldwide after it was announced corporate profits decreased by 33% in 2019.

In October 2020, HSBC committed to achieve zero-emission by 2050, e.g., by this year it would not only become carbon neutral by itself but also will work only with carbon-neutral clients. It also committed to providing 750–1,000 billion dollars to help clients make the transition. It also pledged to achieve carbon neutrality in his own operations by 2030.

In January 2021, HSBC announced that it would be closing 82 branches in Britain. In May 2021, HSBC announced the exit of US retail banking business by selling 10 California branches to Cathay Bank and 80 branches to Citizens Financial Group and closing the remaining branches. The bank said it intends to focus on the banking and wealth management needs of globally connected affluent and high net worth clients.

In August 2021, HSBC announced the acquisition of AXA Singapore. HSBC Insurance (Asia-Pacific) Holdings Ltd, an indirect wholly-owned subsidiary of HSBC would acquire 100% of the issued share capital of AXA Singapore for $575m. In December 2021, HSBC Asset Management (India) Private Ltd, an indirect wholly-owned subsidiary of HSBC announced it would acquire L&T Investment Management for $425 million from L&T Finance Holdings.

In October 2020, HSBC committed to achieve zero emission by 2050, e.g., by this year it would not only become carbon neutral by itself but also will work only with carbon neutral clients. It also committed to provide between 750 billion and 1 trillion dollars to help clients make the transition. It also pledged to achieve carbon neutrality in his own operations by 2030. In May 2021, HSBC committed to end the financing of the coal industry, with a commitment to publish a new coal policy and provide further detail on its climate strategy by the end of 2021. The organisation's "Thermal Coal Phase-Out Policy" was published in December 2021.

In July 2022, HSBC became the first foreign lender to open a Chinese Communist Party (CCP) committee in its Chinese investment banking subsidiary. The subsidiary, HSBC Qianhai Securities, is a 90% HSBC-owned joint venture.

In November 2022, HSBC announced the exit of Canadian market. Royal Bank of Canada will acquire 100% of the common shares of HSBC Canada for an all-cash purchase price of $13.5 billion, which is a multiple of 9.4 times HSBC Canada's estimated 2024 earnings. Completion of the transaction is expected by late 2023, subject to regulatory approvals. HSBC has been under pressure to cut costs and divest non-Asian businesses.

In February 2023, HSBC announced that its profits for the last quarter of 2022 has almost doubled when compared to the same time of year before. However, its pre-tax profit actually fell because it absorbed the cost of selling its French retail banking operations. The bank also announced that they were closing 114 branches in the United Kingdom. The move came as more people were using online banking since the pandemic, reducing the need for physical branches. The move has been criticized by Unite.

Operations

HSBC has its world headquarters at 8 Canada Square in Canary Wharf, London.

Size, profit and auditors

 As of 2014, according to Relsbank, HSBC was the fourth-largest bank in the world by assets (with $2,670.00  billion), the second largest in terms of revenues (with $146.50 billion) and the largest in terms of market value (with $180.81 billion).
 It was also the most profitable bank in the world with $19.13 billion in net income in 2007 (compared to Citigroup's $3.62 billion and Bank of America's $14.98 billion in the same period). 
 In June 2006, The Economist stated that since the end of 2005 HSBC has been rated the largest banking group in the world by Tier 1 capital. In June 2014 The Banker ranked HSBC first in Western Europe and 5th in the world for Tier 1 capital. 
 In February 2008, HSBC was named the world's most valuable banking brand by The Banker magazine.
 HSBC has been audited by PwC, one of the Big Four auditors since 2015.

Brexit
In preparation for Brexit, HSBC announced that it will be facing as much as $300 million in legal and relocation fees as it plans to relocate 1,000 staff members from London to Paris. In the second quarter of 2017, the bank had $4 million in charges for "costs associated with the U.K.'s exit from the EU". HSBC plans to move roughly one-fifth of its London-based investment bankers to its Paris offices in order to maintain a continuous access point to the European Union's single market. While its headquarters will remain in London, the staff movement is expected to avoid a loss of $1 billion of revenue after Brexit.

Principal subsidiaries

These are HSBC's subsidiaries worldwide:

Asia Pacific

 HSBC Armenia
 HSBC Bangladesh
 HSBC Bank Australia
 HSBC Bank India
 HSBC Bank Indonesia
 The Hongkong and Shanghai Banking Corporation
 Hang Seng Bank
 HSBC China
 HSBC Bank Malaysia
 HSBC Bank Philippines
 HSBC Bank Vietnam
 HSBC Korea (Only commercial banking) (HSBC Korea withdrew consumer retail banking from South Korea in 2013)
 HSBC Singapore
 HSBC Sri Lanka
 HSBC Taiwan

HSBC ceased retail banking operations in Thailand and Japan in 2012. HSBC entered Brunei in 1947 but commenced winding down its operations in April 2016 citing the bank's optimisation of its global network and reduced complexity.  HSBC stopped offering Amanah (a retail banking product and service in compliance with the Islamic Shari'ah laws) in Bahrain, Bangladesh, Indonesia, Singapore and the UAE following a strategic review of its global Islamic Finance businesses, while the bank continues on offering the same Shari'ah compliant products and services in Malaysia and in Saudi Arabia.

Europe

 HSBC Bank (Europe)
 HSBC France
 HSBC Greece
 HSBC Trinkaus und Burkhardt AG
 HSBC Bank Malta
 HSBC Private Bank (Suisse) SA
 HSBC UK Bank plc

Further, HSBC Private Bank is a name for UK-based private banking division. HSBC Expat is the offshore banking division of the HSBC Group based in St Helier, Jersey that focuses on providing finance and cross border services to expatriates and migrants.

Americas

 HSBC Bank Argentina
 HSBC Bank Bermuda
 HSBC Bank Canada
 HSBC Bank USA
 HSBC Finance Corporation
 HSBC México
 HSBC Securities (USA) Inc.

Middle East and North Africa

 HSBC Bank Egypt
 HSBC Bank Jordan
 HSBC Bank Middle East
 HSBC Bank (Turkey)
 The Saudi British Bank
 HSBC Saudi Arabia

Principal business groups and divisions
HSBC organises its customer-facing activities within three business groups: Commercial Banking (CMB); Global Banking and Markets (GBM); Wealth and Personal Banking (WPB).

Commercial banking
HSBC provides financial services to small, medium-sized and middle-market enterprises. The group has more than 2 million such customers, including sole proprietors, partnerships, clubs and associations, incorporated businesses and publicly quoted companies.

In December 2015, HSBC announced that Noel Quinn will succeed Simon Cooper as the chief executive officer of Commercial Banking. Simon Cooper has decided to leave the bank to pursue other opportunities.

Global banking and markets
Global Banking and Markets is the investment banking arm of HSBC. For Global Banking, it provides investment banking and financing products for corporate and institutional clients, including corporate banking, investment banking, capital markets, trade services, payments and cash management, and leveraged acquisition finance. For Markets and Securities Services, it provides services in equities, credit and rates, foreign exchange, money markets and securities services. Global Banking and Markets has offices in more than 60 countries and territories worldwide, and positions itself as "emerging markets-led and financing-focused".

Wealth and personal banking
Wealth and Personal Banking helps customers to take care of their day-to-day finances and to manage, protect and grow their wealth. HSBC provides more than 54 million customers worldwide with a full range of personal financial services, including current and savings accounts, mortgage loans, car financing, insurance, credit cards, loans, pensions and investments. Retail Banking and Wealth Management (also known as RBWM) was previously referred to as Personal Financial Services (PFS). This rename was announced during HSBC's 2011 Investor Day.

In 2020, HSBC announced merging two of its business lines: Retail Banking and Wealth Management & Global Private Banking to form a new business unit as Wealth and Personal Banking.

Group service centers

As a cost-saving measure HSBC is offshoring processing work to lower-cost economies in order to reduce the cost of providing services in developed countries. These locations take on work such as data processing and customer service, but also internal software engineering at Pune (India), Gurgaon (India), Bangalore (India), Chennai (India), Hyderabad (India), Vishakhapatnam (India), Kolkata (India), Colombo (Sri Lanka), Guangzhou (China), Curitiba (Brazil) and Kuala Lumpur (Malaysia). Chief Operating Officer Alan Jebson said in March 2005 that he would be very surprised if fewer than 25,000 people were working in the centers over the next three years: "I don't have a precise target but I would be surprised if we had less than 15 (global service centers) in three years' time." He went on to say that each centre cost the bank from $20m to $30m to set up, but that for every job moved the bank saves about $20,000 (£10,400). Trades unions, particularly in the UK and US, blame these centers for job losses in developed countries, and also for the effective imposition of wage caps on their members.

Products

HSBC Direct
HSBC Direct is a telephone/online direct banking operation which attracts customers through mortgages, accounts and savings. It was first launched in the USA in November 2005 and is based on HSBC's 'First Direct' subsidiary in Britain which was launched in the 1980s. The service is now also available in Canada, Taiwan, South Korea, Australia, France. Poland is launching business direct in September 2009. In the US, HSBC Direct is now part of HSBC Advance.

HSBCnet
HSBCnet provides access to transaction banking functionality – ranging from payments and cash management to trade services features – as well as to research and analytical content from HSBC. It also includes foreign exchange and money markets trading functionality. The system is used widely by HSBC's high-end corporate and institutional clients served variously by the bank's global banking and markets, commercial banking, and global transaction banking divisions. HSBCnet is also the brand under which HSBC markets its global e-commerce proposition to its corporate and institutional clients.

HSBC Advance
HSBC Advance is the group's product aimed at working professionals. The exact benefits and qualifications vary depending on country, but typically require a monthly direct deposit or maintain US$5,000 of deposit/investments or residential mortgage. Business owners may use commercial relationship to qualify. Advantages may vary depending on country, such as day-to-day banking services including but not limited to a Platinum Credit Card, Advance ATM Card, Current Account and Savings Account. Protection plans and Financial Planning Services. A HSBC Advance customer enables the customer to open accounts in another country and transfer their credit history.

HSBC Premier
HSBC Premier is the group's premium financial services product. It has its own portfolio of credit cards around the world. The exact benefits and qualification criteria vary depending on the country. Customers have a dedicated premier relationship manager, global 24-hour access to call centres, free banking services, and preferential rates. A HSBC Premier customer receives the HSBC Premier services in all countries that offer HSBC Premier, without having to meet that country's qualifying criteria ("Premier in One, Premier in All").

HSBC Jade
HSBC Jade is an invite-only financial services product aimed at individuals with net worths typically between $1 million and $5 million in investible assets held with HSBC. Before invitation, members must be HSBC Premier members for a designated period of time. In addition to HSBC Premier benefits, HSBC Jade have select concierge services, estate planning services, and access to Jade Centres around the globe.

Leadership

Current leadership
 Group Chairman: Mark Tucker (October 2017 to present) 
Group Chief Executive: Noel Quinn (March 2020 to present)

List of previous Group Chairmen
The position of Group Chairman was formed in 1991; the preceding position, Chairman of The Hongkong and Shanghai Banking Corporation, remains an active position today.

 Sir William Purves (1991–1998)
 Sir John Bond (1998–2006)
 The Lord Green (2006–2010)
 Sir Douglas Flint (2010–2017)

List of previous Group Chief Executives
The position of Group Chief Executive was formed in 1991; the preceding position, Chief Executive of The Hongkong and Shanghai Banking Corporation, remains an active position today.
Sir William Purves (1991–1993)
 Sir John Bond (1993–1998)
 Sir Keith Whitson (1998–2003)
 The Lord Green (2003–2006)
 Michael Geoghegan (2007–2010)
 Stuart Gulliver (2011–2018)
 John Flint (2018–2019)

Controversies

Money laundering
In both 2003 and 2010, U.S. regulators ordered HSBC to strengthen its anti-money laundering practices. In October 2010, the United States OCC issued a Cease and Desist Order requiring HSBC to strengthen multiple aspects of its Anti-Money Laundering (AML) program. The identified problems included a once massive backlog of over 17,000 alerts identifying suspicious activity, failure to file timely suspicious activity reports with U.S. law enforcement, failure to conduct any due diligence to assess risks to HSBC affiliates before opening correspondent accounts for them, a three-year failure by HBUS from mid-2006 to mid-2009 to conduct any AML of $15 billion in bulk cash transactions from those same HSBC affiliates, failure to monitor $60 trillion in annual wire transfers by customers in countries rated lower risk by HBUS, and inadequate and unqualified AML staffing, resources, and leadership. It was noted that HSBC fully cooperated with the Senate investigation.

In 2012, HSBC was fined by $14 million by Argentina for failure to report suspicious transactions in the country in 2008.

On 19 July 2012, India investigated alleged violation of safety compliance, in which Indian employees were believed to be involved. In June 2013, a media outlet in India did an undercover expose where HSBC officers were caught on camera agreeing to launder "black money." HSBC placed these employees on leave pending their own internal investigation.

In November 2012, it was reported that HSBC had set up offshore accounts in Jersey for suspected drug-dealers and other criminals, and that HM Revenue and Customs had launched an investigation following a whistle blower leaking details of £700 million allegedly held in HSBC accounts in the Crown dependency.

Following search warrants and raids beginning in January 2013, in mid-March 2013 Argentina's main taxing authority accused HSBC of using fake receipts and dummy accounts to facilitate money laundering and tax evasion.

In early February 2013, appearing before UK's Parliamentary Banking Standards Commission, CEO Stuart Gulliver acknowledged that the structure of the bank had been "not fit for purpose." He also stated, "Matters that should have been shared and escalated were not shared and escalated." HSBC has also been accused of laundering money for terrorist groups.

In June 2015, HSBC was fined by the Geneva authorities after an investigation into money laundering within its Swiss subsidiary. The fine was 40 million Swiss Francs.

In 2018, HSBC was fined 15 million rand by South Africa's central bank for weaknesses in its processes meant to detect money laundering and terrorism financing, though it also added that HSBC was not found to have facilitated any transactions involving money laundering or the financing of terrorism in South Africa.

In 2020, HSBC told AUSTRAC that it may have broken Australia's anti money laundering and counter-terrorism laws after allegedly failing to report thousands of transactions to AUSTRAC.

In July 2021, HSBC disclosed that in 2016 it discovered a suspected money laundering network that received $4.2 billion worth of payments which has raised questions over whether it disclosed this appropriately to US monitors as the bank was still under probation by U.S. authorities over anti-money laundering concerns.

In December 2021, HSBC was fined 64 million pounds ($85 million) by British regulators for failings in its anti-money laundering processes spanning eight years.

US Senate investigation (2012)
In July 2012, a US Senate committee issued a report which stated that HSBC had been in breach of money-laundering rules, and had assisted Iran and North Korea to circumvent US nuclear-weapons sanctions.

In December 2012, Assistant U.S. Attorney General Lanny Breuer suggested that the U.S. government might resist criminal prosecution of HSBC which could lead to the loss of the bank's U.S. charter. He stated, "Our goal here is not to bring HSBC down, it's not to cause a systemic effect on the economy, it's not for people to lose thousands of jobs."

In December 2012, HSBC was penalised $1.9 billion (US), the largest fine under the Bank Secrecy Act, for violating four U.S. laws designed to protect the U.S. financial system. HSBC had allegedly laundered at least $881 million in drugs proceeds through the U.S. financial system for international cartels, as well as processing an additional $660 million for banks in US sanctioned countries. According to the report, "The U.S. bank subsidiary [also] failed to monitor more than $670 billion in wire transfers and more than $9.4 billion in purchases of physical dollars from its Mexico unit." As part of the agreement deferring its prosecution, HSBC acknowledged that for years it had ignored warning signs that drug cartels in Mexico were using its branches to launder millions of dollars, and also acknowledged that HSBC's international staff had stripped identifying information on transactions made through the United States from countries facing economic sanctions such as Iran and Sudan.

A December 2012 CNNMoney article compared the 1.9 billion dollar fine to HSBC's profit "last year" (2011) of 16.8 billion.

In 2016, HSBC was sued by Mexican families involved in deaths by organized-crime gangs for processing funds ("money laundering") for the Sinaloa cartel.

FinCEN Files (2020) 
The FinCEN Files showed that HSBC continued to serve alleged criminals and corporations involved in government corruption, including $292 million for the Waked Family company Viva Panama between 2010 and 2016 before the United States Department of the Treasury declared it a drug money-laundering organization. HSBC's activities took place while the bank was under probation from the U.S. government; six former HSBC employees reported to the International Consortium of Investigative Journalists that the a deferred prosecution agreement for HSBC marked a "cultural shift" in the organization toward profit-making motives. Employees working in compliance at HSBC also expressed concern to Buzzfeed about what they felt were inadequate efforts to combat money laundering, including hasty investigations and unachievable internal investigation quotas. In response to the report HSBC said it is "continually seeking ways to improve" its financial crime compliance regime.

Forex, Libor and Euribor scandals (2014)
The bank was fined US$275m by the US CFTC in 2014 for taking part in the Forex scandal. The bank also settled for US$18m in the related Libor scandal and EUR 33m for the Euribor rate scandal (relative to other banks a small amount). In October 2020 HSBC was fined about $2.2 million over the Euribor rate scandal in Switzerland.

Belgian tax fraud, money laundering charges (2014) 
In November 2014, HSBC was accused of tax fraud and money laundering by Belgian Prosecutors for helping hundreds of clients move money into offshore tax havens.

In August 2019, HSBC agreed to pay $336 million to settle the case.

Tax avoidance schemes (2015)

In February 2015, the International Consortium of Investigative Journalists released information about the bank's business conduct under the title Swiss Leaks. The ICIJ alleges that the bank profited from doing business with tax evaders and other clients. The BBC reported that the bank had put pressure on media not to report about the controversy, with British newspaper The Guardian claiming bank advertising had been put "on pause" after The Guardians coverage of the matter. Peter Oborne, chief political commentator at The Daily Telegraph, resigned from the paper and in an open letter claimed the newspaper suppressed negative stories and dropped investigations into HSBC because of the bank's advertising.

In November 2017, HSBC agreed to pay $352 million to settle a French investigation into the case.

In August 2019, the former head of HSBC Swiss from 2000 to 2008, Peter Braunwalder pleaded guilty in a French court for helping wealthy clients hide $1.8 billion. He was fined $560,000 and received a one-year suspended jail sentence.

In December 2019, HSBC Swiss agreed to pay a $192 million United States fine for the case.

$3.5 billion currency scheme (2016)
In July 2016, the United States Department of Justice charged two executives from HSBC Bank over an alleged $3.5 billion currency scheme which defrauded HSBC clients and "manipulated the foreign exchange market to benefit themselves and their bank". "Mark Johnson and Stuart Scott, both British citizens, are being accused". "Johnson was arrested late Tuesday [19 July 2016] at JFK International Airport in New York City." "Stuart Scott, who was HSBC's European head of foreign exchange trading in London until December 2014, is accused of the same crimes. A warrant was issued for Scott's arrest, but he fled to Britain. In July 2018 the High Court of Justice ruled against extraditing him to the United States since most of the alleged crimes took place in Britain and because Scott has no significant connection to the United States.

Mark Johnson was later convicted of nine counts of wire fraud and conspiracy to defraud related to front running the currency trades of HSBC clients and sentenced to two years in federal prison. He was released after serving three months in prison and was allowed to return home to the U.K. while he pursued an appeal. November 2020 the U.S. Supreme Court declined to hear an appeal of his 2017 conviction, which was previously upheld by the United States Court of Appeals for the Second Circuit. It meant he would have to return to the U.S. to serve his sentence. In February 2021 a judge ruled that Johnson would not need to report to prison until he is vaccinated against COVID-19. In January 2018 HSBC agreed to pay a $101.5 million fine over the case.

Defense industry (2018)
In December 2018, The Jerusalem Post reported that HSBC confirmed that the bank would divest from Elbit Systems Ltd., Israel's largest non-government-owned military contractor, active in numerous defence-related industries. HSBC justified its decision by claiming it "strongly supports observance of international human rights principles as they apply to business." In response, the group Palestine Solidarity Campaign (PSC) released a press release in which it "declared a victory" and quoted PSC director Ben Jamal saying the decision demonstrates "the effectiveness of Boycott, Divestment, and Sanctions as a tactic." JewishPress.com reported that multiple sources claimed HSBC's decision was not influenced by the BDS movement but was an "investment decision." 

In an editorial titled "Bad Banking", The Jerusalem Post wrote, "HSBC, if this is your final decision, you will go down on the wrong side of history. Do you understand that Israel is using Elbit technology to protect itself against Palestinian terror, and not to undermine the rights of the Palestinian people? If you are really concerned about human rights, perhaps you might consider using some of your own income to invest in the Palestinian economy, and boost cooperation between Israeli and Palestinian institutions."

Housing crisis fine (2018) 
In 2018, HSBC agreed to pay a $765 million fine to settle claims it mis-sold Residential mortgage-backed securities between 2005 and 2007. Forbes noted the settlement was the lowest of 11 banks that settled with the Department of Justice. HSBC has said in statement that it has been improving relevant control mechanisms since the financial crisis.

Support for China's Security Law for Hong Kong (2020)
In June 2020, on the eve of the anniversary of the Tiananmen Square protests, HSBC took the rare step of wading into political issues by publicly backing Beijing's controversial new national security law for Hong Kong. The chief executive for HSBC's Asia-Pacific division, Peter Wong, signed a petition supporting the law and stated in a post on Chinese social media that HSBC "respects and supports all laws that stabilise Hong Kong's social order."

Though HSBC moved its headquarters to London in 1993, Hong Kong remains its largest market accounting for 54% of its profit, a third of its global revenue, and 50,000 local staff. In response, Joshua Wong, a top Hong Kong pro-democracy activist decried the bank's position stating that HSBC's stance demonstrates "how China will use the national security law as new leverage for more political influence over foreign business community in this global city." Alistair Carmichael, the U.K. chairman of the All Parliamentary Group on Hong Kong, said HSBC made a serious error by bending to China's will regarding the security law, calling it "a colossal misjudgment" since it would be seen as a large British corporation advocating for "a fairly flagrant breach of international law" when banks rely on a rules-based system. Human Rights Watch alleged that "the new national security law will deal the most severe blow to the rights of people in Hong Kong since the territory's transfer to China in 1997."

British Foreign Secretary Dominic Raab also commented on HSBC's stance, saying "Businesses will make their own judgment calls, but let me just put it this way – we will not sacrifice the people of Hong Kong over the altar of banker bonuses".

Since August 2020, HSBC has frozen the accounts of numerous pro-democratic organizations and activists, and their families, including Jimmy Lai, Ted Hui and the Good Neighbour North District Church.

In January 2021, the CEO of HSBC defended its relationship with Chinese authorities in Hong Kong  and freezing of Ted Hui's account to the United Kingdom's parliamentary foreign affairs committee.

In February 2021, more than 50 members of the Inter-Parliamentary Alliance on China called for the immediate unfreezing of funds belonging to Ted Hui and his family,

In 2023 an All-party parliamentary group released a report regarding the actions of the bank's operations in Hong Kong. The report found that HSBC was complicit in human rights abuses by bank's cutting off the pension plan after the Hong Kong authority cut off pension funding for those that fled the anti-democratic crackdown on the region. The group was chaired by Alistair Carmichael who stated that the bank has been "complicit in the repression of the human rights of innocent Hong Kongers".

Sterling Lads (2021)

EU antitrust regulators fined HSBC 174.3 million euros for foreign exchange market rigging by exchanging sensitive information and trading plans through an online chat room dubbed "Sterling Lads".

Other

Data loss (2008)
In 2008, HSBC issued a statement confirming it had lost a disc containing details of 370,000 customers of its life insurance business. HSBC said the disc had failed to arrive in the post between offices and it was not encrypted. The bank was later fined over £3 million by the Financial Services Authority for failing to exercise reasonable care with regards to data protection in connection with this and other lost customer information.

Breaching Iran sanctions for Huawei (2009–2014)
From 2009 to 2014, in breach of United States sanctions on Iran, the bank facilitated money transfers in Iran on behalf of the Chinese company Huawei.

Gaddafi Libya claims (2011)
According to Global Witness and cited by BBC, "billions of dollars of assets" were held by the bank for the Libyan Investment Authority, controlled by Colonel Muammar Gaddafi. Following Gaddafi's overthrow the bank declined to reveal information about the funds citing customer confidentiality.

Deforestation claims (2012, 2018)
In the report titled "In the Future There Will Be No Forests Left" produced by Global Witness, the bank was accused of supporting the seven largest Malaysian timber conglomerates, which are responsible for deforestation in the Malaysian state of Sarawak. The bank declined to divulge its clients, citing client confidentiality, but maintains that the accusations are not accurate. The environmentalist group Greenpeace has also alleged that the bank is contributing to the deforestation in Indonesia and subsequent hazardous impacts in the region by providing funds to palm oil producers for new plantations. The bank has denied these claims, citing its sustainability policy that prohibits the bank from financing projects that "damage high conservation value forest."

Money-laundering policies (2014)
The bank was reported to have refused large cash withdrawals for customers without a third-party letter confirming what the money would be used for. Douglas Carswell, the Conservative MP for Clacton, was alarmed by the policy: "All these regulations which have been imposed on banks allow enormous interpretation. It basically infantilises the customer. In a sense, your money becomes pocket money and the bank becomes your parent."

Payments-processing failures (2015)
In August 2015, the bank failed to process BACS payments resulting in thousands of salaries not paid, house purchase and payment for essential home care failures.

Spam phone calls (2020) 
In January 2020, HSBC agreed to pay a $2.4 million settlement for a lawsuit filed in 2015 by customers who stated they received spam phone calls from the company.

Racism report (2021)
HSBC banker Ian Clarke alleged a failure of HSBC to retain or promote black and other ethnic minority staff, a lack of such people in senior positions, and insufficient policies to address these problems. HSBC did not address the specifics of Clarke's assertions and he resigned shortly thereafter.

Climate change (2022)
Stuart Kirk, the bank's global head of responsible investing, was suspended in May due to his speech in which he said "There's always some nut job telling me about the end of the world." He quit his position in July, criticising the "cancel culture" in his Linkedin post, and blaming it for his suspension and resignation. In October, the company had its two advertisements banned due to being misleading about the company's activities for reducing the effects of climate change. The Advertising Standards Authority (ASA), who was behind the ban, stated that the posters omitted material information about how HSBC planned to tackle the climate change and reduce its impact.

Logo

The group announced in November 1998 that the HSBC brand and the hexagon symbol would be adopted as the unified brand in all the markets where HSBC operates, with the aim of enhancing recognition of the group and its values by customers, shareholders and staff throughout the world. The hexagon symbol was originally adopted by the Hongkong and Shanghai Banking Corporation as its logo in 1983. It was developed from the bank's house flag, a white rectangle divided diagonally to produce a red hourglass shape. Like many other Hong Kong company flags that originated in the 19th century, and because of its founder's nationality, the design was based on the cross of Saint Andrew. The logo was designed by Austrian graphic artist Henry Steiner.

In 2018, HSBC made minor changes to their logo. The wordmark was repositioned from left to the right, resized to be smaller, and was switched from Serif to a licensed custom font called Univers Next for HSBC. The logo red was made slightly darker red.

Sponsorships

Having sponsored the Jaguar Racing Formula One team since the days of Stewart Grand Prix, HSBC ended its relationship with motorsport after seven years when Red Bull purchased Jaguar Racing from Ford.

In the mid-2000s, HSBC switched its focus to golf, taking title sponsorship of several events such as the HSBC World Match Play Championship, HSBC Women's World Match Play Championship (now defunct), WGC-HSBC Champions, Abu Dhabi HSBC Golf Championship, HSBC Women's Champions, HSBC Golf Business Forum and HSBC Golf Roots (a youth development programme). HSBC was named the 'Official Banking Partner' of the Open Championship, in a five-year deal announced in 2010.

In October 2010, the International Rugby Board announced that they had concluded a 5-year deal with HSBC which granted them status as the first-ever title sponsor of the World Sevens Series. Through the accord, HSBC is paying more than $100 million for the title naming rights to all the tournaments. HSBC opted to sub-license the naming rights to all but one of the individual tournaments while retaining its name sponsorship of the overall series and the Hong Kong Sevens. The company also sponsors the Hong Kong Rugby Union and the New South Wales Waratahs team in Super Rugby. It sponsored British & Irish Lions during their 2009 tour to South Africa and 2013 tour to Australia.

HSBC is the official banking partner of the Wimbledon Championships tennis tournament, providing banking facilities on site and renaming the junior event as the HSBC Road to Wimbledon National 14 and Under Challenge.

HSBC's other sponsorships are mainly in the area of education, health and the environment. In November 2006, HSBC announced a $5 million partnership with SOS Children as part of Future First.

See also

 HSBC lions
 List of banks in the United Kingdom
 List of buildings and structures in Hong Kong
 List of investors in Bernard L. Madoff Investment Securities
 Peking University HSBC Business School
 Primary dealer

References

External links

 

 

 
1865 establishments in Hong Kong
1999 initial public offerings
Banks established in 1865
Companies based in the London Borough of Tower Hamlets
Companies listed on the Hong Kong Stock Exchange
Companies listed on the London Stock Exchange
Companies listed on the New York Stock Exchange
Systemically important financial institutions
Holding companies of the United Kingdom
Holding companies established in 1991
Investment banks
Primary dealers
Banks of the United Kingdom